The men's 100 metres at the 1962 European Athletics Championships was held in Belgrade, then Yugoslavia, at JNA Stadium on 12 and 13 September 1962.

Medalists

Results

Final
13 September
Wind: -0.6 m/s

Semi-finals
12 September

Semi-final 1
Wind: -0.6 m/s

Semi-final 2
Wind: -0.3 m/s

Semi-final 3
Wind: -0.4 m/s

Heats
12 September

Heat 1
Wind: 0 m/s

Heat 2
Wind: 0.2 m/s

Heat 3
Wind: 0 m/s

Heat 4
Wind: 0 m/s

Heat 5
Wind: 0 m/s

Heat 6
Wind: 0 m/s

Participation
According to an unofficial count, 29 athletes from 14 countries participated in the event.

 (2)
 (1)
 (3)
 (3)
 (1)
 (1)
 (1)
 (3)
 (3)
 (3)
 (1)
 (1)
 (3)
 (3)

References

100 metres
100 metres at the European Athletics Championships